Ectemnius maculosus is a species of square-headed wasp in the family Crabronidae. It is found in Europe and Northern Asia (excluding China) and North America.

References

External links

 

Crabronidae
Articles created by Qbugbot
Insects described in 1790